Major-General Theodore Henry Birkbeck  (1911–1976) was a British Army officer.

Military career
Born the son of Major-General Sir William Birkbeck and Mabel Shaw, Birkbeck was transferred from a Territorial Army commission into the Border Regiment on 17 November 1932. He saw action in operations against the Italian Army in Somaliland during the East African campaign and then as commanding officer of the 11th (Kenya) Battalion, King's African Rifles, in Burma in autumn 1944 during the Burma campaign of the Second World War.

After the war he became commanding officer of the 3rd Battalion, the Parachute Regiment in Palestine during the Palestine Emergency in 1947, commander of 70th East African Infantry Brigade in August 1955 during the Mau Mau Uprising and Deputy Military Secretary at the War Office in December 1958. He went on to be General Officer Commanding 49th (North Midlands and West Riding) Division and North Midland District of the Territorial Army in July 1960 and Director-General of the Territorial Army in September 1962 before retiring in February 1966.

References

1911 births
1976 deaths
British Army major generals
Companions of the Order of the Bath
Commanders of the Order of the British Empire
Companions of the Distinguished Service Order
Border Regiment officers
British people of American descent
British military personnel of the Palestine Emergency
British Army personnel of World War II
British military personnel of the Mau Mau Uprising